Orri Sigurður Ómarsson (born 18 February 1995) is an Icelandic footballer player who plays as a centre back for Valur.

Career
Orri started his career playing for HK. He played 20 games during the 2011 season.

In 2012, he joined Aarhus Gymnastikforening (AGS) under 19 team.

On 22 July 2014 he was promoted to the AGF first team.

In 2015, he joined Valur in the Icelandic Premier League.

In January 2018, Orri joined Sarpsborg 08. He was immediately loaned out to HamKam.

International
He made his debut for Iceland national football team on 10 January 2017 in a friendly against China. He was not selected for Iceland's 2018 FIFA World Cup squad.

References

External links
 profile on dr.dk (Danish)
 

1995 births
Living people
Orri Sigurdur Omarsson
Orri Sigurdur Omarsson
Orri Sigurdur Omarsson
Orri Sigurdur Omarsson
Orri Sigurdur Omarsson
Orri Sigurdur Omarsson
Aarhus Gymnastikforening players
Orri Sigurdur Omarsson
Hamarkameratene players
Orri Sigurdur Omarsson
Norwegian First Division players
Orri Sigurdur Omarsson
Orri Sigurdur Omarsson
Orri Sigurdur Omarsson
Expatriate men's footballers in Denmark
Expatriate footballers in Norway
Association football defenders